Königshofen may refer to:

 Bad Königshofen (Bad Königshofen im Grabfeld), a town in Bavaria, Germany
 Lauda-Königshofen, a town in the Main-Tauber district in Baden-Württemberg, Germany